The Commercial Bank of India, also known as Exchange Bank was a bank which was established in Bombay Presidency (now Mumbai), in 1845 of the British Raj period. The bank failed in the crash of 1866, after successfully operating for 20 years. The bank had eight branches, exclusive of the head office at Bombay, viz: London, Calcutta, Hong Kong, Fuzhou, Shanghai, Hankou (now part of Wuhan), Yokohama and Singapore, with an agency for the purchase of bullion at San Francisco. Commercial Bank of India then was winded up as directed by the Master of the Rolls, under the corresponding section of the Companies Act of England, where the company was registered under the Indian law and was not registered in England, but was carrying on business in England.

See also

 History of Mumbai
 Banking in India

References

Banks established in 1845
Banks disestablished in 1866
1845 establishments in British India
Defunct banks of India